Aramist may refer to:

 Gary Aramist, Israeli sport shooter
 Metaraminol